Pseudocampylaea is a genus of air-breathing land snails, terrestrial pulmonate gastropod mollusks in the subfamily Geomitrinae of the family Geomitridae, the hairy snails and their allies.

Species
Species within the genus Pseudocampyaea include:
 Pseudocampylaea lowii (A. Férussac, 1835)
 Pseudocampylaea portosanctana  (G. B. Sowerby I, 1824) - the type species

References 

 Bank, R. A. (2017). Classification of the Recent terrestrial Gastropoda of the World. Last update: July 16th, 2017.

External links 
 http://www.animalbase.uni-goettingen.de/zooweb/servlet/AnimalBase/home/genus?id=1210

Geomitridae
Taxonomy articles created by Polbot